The 2007 Montreux Volley Masters was held in Montreux, Switzerland between 5 June and 10 June 2007. In the tournament participated 8 teams. The team of China won the Tournament, Cuba placed 2nd and the Netherlands 3rd.

Participated teams

 China
 Cuba
 Germany
 Netherlands
 Poland
 Russia
 Serbia
 Turkey

Groups

Group A

|}

Results

Group B

|}

Results

Final round

Final standings

Awards
Most Valuable Player:  Nancy Carrillo 
Best Scorer:  Neslihan Darnel
Best Spiker:  Rosir Calderón 
Best Blocker:  Christiane Fürst
Best Server:  Yanelis Santos 
Best Digger:  Mariola Zenik 
Best Receiver:  Zhang Xian 
Best Setter:  Wei Qiuyue

External links
 Official Page of 2007 Montreux Volley Masters
Federation Internationale de Volleyball

Montreux Volley Masters
Montreux Volley Masters
Montreux Volley Masters